is a railway station on the Kagoshima Main Line, operated by JR Kyushu in Higashi-ku, Fukuoka, Kukuoka City, Fukuoka Prefecture, Japan.

Lines

Layout
The station consists of one side and one island platforms serving three elevated tracks.

Adjacent stations

History
When the Kyushu Railway was nationalized on 1 July 1907, Japanese Government Railways (JGR) took over control of the station. On 12 October 1909, the station became part of the Hitoyoshi Main Line and then on 21 November 1909, part of the Kagoshima Main Line. With the privatization of Japanese National Railways (JNR), the successor of JGR, on 1 April 1987, JR Kyushu took over control of the station. From October 2001 to November 2003, construction work to build a new elevated station was undertaken. The new station was opened on 13 March 2004 and is about 400 metres north of the old location.

Passenger statistics
In fiscal 2016, the station was used by an average of 5,679 passengers daily (boarding passengers only), and it ranked 32nd among the busiest stations of JR Kyushu.

Surrounding area
Hakozaki Shrine

See also 
List of railway stations in Japan

References

External links
Hakozaki Station (JR Kyushu)

Railway stations in Fukuoka Prefecture
Railway stations in Japan opened in 1890